Robert Bergman is a former American football and track and field coach. He served as the head football coach at the Rose-Hulman Institute of Technology in Terre Haute, Indiana from 1968 to 1976 and DePauw University in Greencastle, Indiana from 1977 to 1978, compiling a career college football coaching record of 39–60–2.

Bergman graduated from Batesville High School in Batesville, Indiana and then attended Hanover College in Hanover, Indiana, where he played college football. He began his coaching career in the high school ranks in the state of Indiana, working as an assistant football, assistant basketball, and head track coach at Westfield High School and Sheridan High School. In 1964, he was named head football coach at Attica High School, where served for two seasons.  He held the same position at Greencastle High School in 1966 and 1967.

Head coaching record

College football

References

Year of birth missing (living people)
Living people
DePauw Tigers football coaches
Hanover Panthers football players
Rose–Hulman Fightin' Engineers football coaches
High school basketball coaches in Indiana
High school football coaches in Indiana
College track and field coaches in the United States
Indiana University alumni
People from Batesville, Indiana
Players of American football from Indiana